The Irish Architectural Archive was established in 1976 by Dr Edward McParland and Nicholas Robinson as the National Trust Archive. Its objective is to collect and preserve material of every kind relating to the architecture of Ireland, and make it available to the public. It is based at 45 Merrion Square, Dublin, and is an independent private company with charitable status. 45 Merrion Square, constructed in 1794, was restored between 2002 and 2004 for use as an archive by the Office of Public Works, and is itself a notable example of the city's Georgian architecture.

The Archive comprises over 3,500 individual acquisitions, ranging from single items - a book, pamphlet, drawing or photograph - to the thousands of drawings and files created by large architectural practices.

Colum O'Riordan is the current Director.

History 
Edward McParland and Nicholas Robinson founded the National Trust Archive in 1976, with Nick Sheaf appointed the first Director, and premises at 63 Merrion Square. Among the founding items in the collection were drawings “from the practice established in Ireland by Augustus Pugin in the late 1830s”.

The organisation was formally designated national archive status in 1996, by Ruairi Quinn who was then minister of finance.

Alistair Rowan was appointed Director in 1981, and the organisation was renamed the Irish Architectural Archive and moved to number 73 Merrion Square. It moved on to 45 Merrion Square in 2004.

Collections

Drawings 
The collections represent the largest body of historic architectural records in Ireland. They include the most significant body of historic Irish architectural drawings in the world, with in excess of 250,000 drawings ranging in date from the late seventeenth to the  twentieth centuries.

Photographs 
Also housed in the Archive are over 400,000 photographs, making this one of the largest collections of photographs in Ireland.

Print 
The Archive also holds an extensive reference library, with more than 15,000 items of printed matter.

The Peter and Mary Doyle Collection 
The IAA holds a collection of photographs and drawings bequeathed by Irish modernist architects Peter and Mary Doyle.

Exhibitions 

3-13 March 2020, Exhibition for a Good Man, a solo exhibition by Irish artist Paula Pohli.

2019, A Visual Window to an Ecclesiastical World, of historical drawings of Church of Ireland buildings, curated by Dr Michael O’Neill FSA.

2018, Memorialising the Sacred, an installation exploring sacred buildings in Crete, curated by Anthony Kelly, Seán McCrum, Paddy Sammon and David Stalling.

2017, House and Home, an exhibition of drawings, publications, models and photographs of mid-18th century to late 20th-century Irish homes. The exhibition marked the 40th anniversary of the archive.

2016, ICC Speak, a collaboration with the Irish Composers’ Collective, featuring immersive installations and performances by: Anna Clifford and Veronica Szabo (Very Clock theatre company); Michelle O’Rourke; the Kirkos Ensemble (who performed work by Adam Bradley, Kevin Free and Robbie Blake); Tonnta Music (who performed compositions by Róisín Hayes and Shell Dooley).

See also
 Architecture of Ireland
 Georgian Dublin
 Irish Georgian Society
 Irish Landmark Trust
 List of Irish Towns with a Market House
 Development and preservation in Dublin

External links
Irish Architectural Archive

References

Archives in the Republic of Ireland
Architecture in Ireland